The Roof-top synagogue was a private synagogue built on the roof of the home of Philip Salomons on the Regency-era Brunswick estate in Hove, now a constituent part of the English city of Brighton and Hove. It is a small octagonal edifice on the top of a glass room forming part of the fourth floor (in British terminology, not counting basement or ground floors), in reference to the Dome of the Rock in Jerusalem.

History
Brunswick Terrace, built in four parts facing the English Channel coast on Hove seafront, was part of the Brunswick estate development laid out at the extreme east end of Hove following the rapid growth of neighbouring Brighton in the early 19th century, and particularly in response to Kemp Town. Although within the parish of Hove, it was closer to the boundary of Brighton and was considered part of the latter. The estate was laid out by Amon Henry Wilds and Charles Busby between 1824 and 1828. The terrace, described as an "elegant Regency block", has Grade I listed status.

The Salomons family moved into 26 Brunswick Terrace in the early 1850s. The interior was badly damaged by fire on 4 September 1852, but was restored. At some point between then and his death in 1867, he commissioned an unknown architect to design and build a private synagogue and prayer-room on the roof of the house. In common with the eastern half of Brunswick Terrace, only this, the central house, has a fourth floor above the portico. It was the subject of an acrimonious debate between Salomons and the members of the Middle Street Synagogue, Brighton, since private synagogues violated the Laws of the Congregation.

In Salomons' lifetime, the synagogue displayed his fine collection of antique Judaica. For a period after his death, it was turned into a Jewish history museum. The Tablets of the Ten Commandments from the synagogue are preserved in the collection of the Salomons Museum in Tunbridge Wells.

The synagogue is now a Grade II listed building. The house is still in use as a private residence – the whole top floor forming one of the building's several flats. The cupola and base can be seen from the lawns on the promenade.

Architecture
The synagogue is a pedimented, Neoclassical cube with glass from waist height, surmounted by an octagonal dome set atop an octagonal drum. Today it contains bench seating for approximately six people, around the edges. The large dome was intended as a replica of the Dome of the Rock in Jerusalem. The roof-top synagogue is one of a considerable number of synagogues and synagogue domes built in the form of an octagon, a tradition that developed from the once widely held opinion that the architects of the Dome of the Rock emulated the shape of the Temple in Jerusalem and, therefore, that the ancient Jewish Temple was octagonal in shape. An example of this opinion can be seen in Raphael's The Marriage of the Virgin.

References
Notes

Bibliography

External links
Brighton's First Jewish Congregations (to 1874) on Jewish Communities and Records – UK (hosted by jewishgen.org'').

Grade II listed buildings in Brighton and Hove
Jews and Judaism in England
Neoclassical synagogues
Round and octagonal synagogues
Synagogues in Brighton and Hove
Former religious buildings and structures in Brighton and Hove
Former synagogues in England